Josh Todd (born 11 June 1994) is an English footballer who plays as a midfielder for Queen of the South. Todd is also the current club captain of the Doonhamers.

Club career

Carlisle United
Todd started his career in the youth team of Carlisle United and became a first-year scholar in 2010. Todd featured occasionally as an unused substitute for the first-team in seasons 2010–11, 2011–12 and 2012–13.

Workington (Loan spell)
On 21 August 2012, Todd joined Conference North club Workington for a month to gain first-team experience, however he only made a single appearance during his time there, featuring as an unused substitute twice. Todd had his first-team debut for the Cumbrians in a 3–0 win at home to Hartlepool United on 26 December 2012, as a 22nd-minute substitute for Paul Thirlwell.

Annan Athletic (Loan spell)
On 29 August 2013, Todd signed for Scottish League Two club Annan Athletic on loan. On 10 January 2014, Todd's loan at the Black and Golds was extended until the end of the season.

Annan Athletic
On 30 January 2014, Todd signed for Annan Athletic on a permanent deal after a successful loan period with the Dumfriesshire club.

Dumbarton
Todd then signed for Scottish Championship club Dumbarton as an amateur in July 2016, after spending time on trial with the Sons, Dunfermline Athletic and Ayr United. After only twenty league appearances for the Sons, Todd was released by the club on 13 January 2017.

St Mirren
On 16 January 2017, Todd signed a short-term contract with St Mirren. Despite being used mainly as a substitute until the end of the season, Todd signed a one-year contract extension with the club in May 2017. 
Todd was released by St Mirren at the end of the 2017–18 season.

Queen of the South (Loan spell)
On 20 March 2018, Todd signed with Queen of the South on an emergency loan deal until the end of that current season. Todd debuted on 20 March 2018 in the 3–2 win at Dundee United.

Queen of the South (First spell)
On 8 May 2018, Todd signed a one-year contract with Queen of the South, after spending time on loan with the Dumfries club towards the end of the 2017–18 season.

Dundee
On 26 February 2019, Todd signed a two-year contract with Dundee on a pre-contract. Todd spent the first half of the 2019–20 season at Dens Park.

Falkirk
On 17 January 2020, after struggling to get first-team action at Dens Park, Todd signed for Scottish League One club Falkirk on an 18-month contract.

Ayr United (Loan spell)
In March 2021, Todd was sent out on loan to Ayr United.

Queen of the South (Second spell)
On 9 June 2021, Todd signed once again for the Doonhamers.

On 8 January 2022, Todd was the captain versus Kilmarnock, as club captain Willie Gibson served a suspension.

On 25 February 2022, Todd signed a one-year extension to his contract to remain at the Doonhamers until the summer of 2023. Todd was also appointed the Dumfries club's new club captain, after Gibson was appointed player-manager.

Career statistics

References

External links

1994 births
Living people
English footballers
Footballers from Carlisle, Cumbria
Association football midfielders
Carlisle United F.C. players
Workington A.F.C. players
Annan Athletic F.C. players
English Football League players
National League (English football) players
Scottish Professional Football League players
Dumbarton F.C. players
St Mirren F.C. players
Queen of the South F.C. players
Dundee F.C. players
Falkirk F.C. players
Ayr United F.C. players